Khaki-ye Sofla (also Romanized as Khākī-ye Soflá; also known as Khākī-ye Pā’īn) is a village in Kakavand-e Gharbi Rural District, Kakavand District, Delfan County, Lorestan Province, Iran. At the 2006 census, its population was 177, in 24 families.

References 

Towns and villages in Delfan County